"Neva Have 2 Worry" is a song by American rapper Snoop Dogg featuring Uncle Chucc, taken from Snoop Dogg's ninth studio album Ego Trippin'. It is produced by Snoop and Terrace Martin, was released on February 19, 2008, as the third single from the album.

Track listing 
Download digital
Neva Have 2 Worry (com a participação de Uncle Chucc)  — 4:18

Music video 
The official video was released on June 23, 2008 on iTunes.

References

2008 singles
Snoop Dogg songs
Songs written by Snoop Dogg
2008 songs
Geffen Records singles
Songs written by Terrace Martin